Dangerous to Men is a lost 1920 American silent comedy film directed by William C. Dowland and starring Viola Dana. It was distributed through Metro Pictures. The working title was "Eliza Comes to Stay".

Cast
Viola Dana as Elisa
Milton Sills as Sandy Verrall
Edward Connelly as Prof. John Vandam
Josephine Crowell as Henrietta
Marian Skinner as Miss Bird
John P. Morse as Tommy
James O. Barrows as Uncle Gregory
Mollie McConnell as Aunt Ellen
Helen Raymond as Vera Raymond
Mary Beaton  
Esther Ralston
Doris Baker (uncredited)

References

External links

Lantern slide

1920 films
American silent feature films
Lost American films
American black-and-white films
Films directed by William C. Dowlan
Metro Pictures films
Silent American comedy films
1920 comedy films
1920 lost films
Lost comedy films
1920s American films